
Gmina Goczałkowice-Zdrój is a rural gmina (administrative district) in Pszczyna County, Silesian Voivodeship, in southern Poland.

Neighbouring gminas
Gmina Goczałkowice-Zdrój is bordered by the gminas of Chybie, Czechowice-Dziedzice, Pszczyna and Strumień.

References

Goczalkowice-Zdroj
Gmina Goczalkowice Zdroj